Audio processing may refer to:
 Audio signal processing
 Auditory system, particularly in the context of auditory processing disorder